Randa Hafez is an Egyptian singer and actress. She started her career as a TV commercial actress. She then worked as a TV presenter in artistic and sport TV shows on Mehwar TV Channel. Her start in singing started in season two of the popular talent shows Star Academy. She gained a wide popularity after the show and entered the acting industry through her participation in the Lebanese TV series Saeat bial'iidhaea with George Khabbaz. In 2009, she released her first album titled Mayala; the album achieved big hits not only in Egypt and the Arab world, but also throughout the world. The song “Gwaya Kteer”- one of her album’s songs - was translated into Turkish language with the voice of the Turkish singer “Sinan Akçıl”. The Bodrum album for international music also included the song “Gwaya Kteer” performed by Randa in Arabic. This was the first time an Arab singer participates in this album.

In 2010, Randa was awarded many prizes in the music field. She received the best Female Rising Singer in Middle East Music Award “MEMA”. She also received the prize of Best Album in 2010 in DEAR GUEST awards. “Gwaya Kteer” also received the best Arab song in MTV Middle East Prizes.

In the same Year, Randa was chosen to be the singer at the opening ceremony of the Mediterranean fustul championship in Libya 2010, in which Rabda performed songs in Arabic and English.

After that, Randa performed more than one single song, such as "Al-Ma'zoon" and "Nazwa", which achieved great success, and the song was listened to by more than 20 million listeners on digital platforms, and it topped the ranking of songs on Arab radios at the time.

After the big hit of “Nazwa”, Rotana Company concluded a contract with Randa to produce her new album, titled “Akter Wahda Mabsuta”.

Randa made a strong comeback to Acting when she co-starred in the series "Le Ala Se’r”/”For the highest price" with the stars Nelly Karim and Ahmed Fahmy and Production of Al-Adl Group.

Discography

Albums
 Mayala 2009
 Aktar Wahda Mabsouta 2019
 Video Clips 
 Ya Alby Ertah
 Saktah Aleih
 Masebtloush Forsa
 Assa’ab Haga
 Single
 Nazwa (Music Video Clip) 2016

References

External links 
 

Living people
Egyptian singer-songwriters
21st-century Egyptian women singers
Year of birth missing (living people)